Municipal elections were held in Chile on 15 and 16 May 2021, in conjunction with elections of members for the Constitutional Convention and regional governors. The process included the direct election of mayors and the members of the council of 345 municipalities administering 346 communes, the smallest administrative division of the country. The elected mayors and members of the Municipal Council took office on June 28, 2021, serving an extraordinary term of 3 years, 5 months and 8 days (until December 6, 2024)  .

These elections were originally scheduled for 25 October 2020, but the COVID-19 pandemic changed the entire election schedule in Chile, moving the 2020 national plebiscite from 26 April to 25 October. The municipal elections were moved then to 11 April 2021, extending the term of the mayors elected in the previous election. Due to the pandemic, the municipal elections (and the concurring other elections) were extended to two days (10 and 11 April) to avoid agglomerations, becoming the first election in Chile to be held in more than one day. Finally, the elections were again postponed to 15 and 16 May 2021 due to a rise in the cases of COVID-19.

Mayors' elections results

Main communes 
List of elected mayors in the 16 regional capitals and the communes with more than 150,000 inhabitants.

Source: SERVEL (99.94% counted)

Results by alliances

Results by parties

Councilors' elections results

Results by alliance

Results by political parties

Notes

References 

Elections in Chile
2021 elections in Chile
May 2021 events in Chile
Presidency of Sebastián Piñera